IMP-1088 is an enzyme inhibitor of the human N-myristoyltransferases NMT1 and NMT2 capable of preventing rhinoviral replication, an area of research relating to potential treatment of the common cold. IMP-1088 works to keep cells from generating infectious virus by targeting the cell instead of the rhinovirus itself. It does this by blocking the NMT protein of the host cell which prevents the virus from assembling its capsid, since viral capsid myristoylation by host NMT is essential for assembly. It is thought unlikely that viruses will evolve resistance to such an approach since IMP-1088 works against the human cell and not the virus.

References 

Enzyme inhibitors
Indazoles
Pyrazoles
Fluoroarenes